Utricularia minutissima is a small or very small terrestrial carnivorous plant that belongs to the genus Utricularia. U. minutissima is native to Asia (Burma, Cambodia, China, India, Indonesia, Japan, Laos, Malaysia, the Philippines, Sri Lanka, Thailand, Vietnam) and Australia. Among the islands of Southeast Asia, it is found on Borneo, New Guinea, and Sumatra.

It was originally described and published by Martin Vahl in 1804. It has been collected in flower between July and December.

Synonyms 
Meionula parviflora Raf.
U. barnesii F.E.Lloyd
U. brevilabris Lace
U. brevilabris var. parviflora Pellegr.
U. calliphysa Stapf
U. capillacea Wight
U. evrardii Pellegr.
U. lilliput Pellegr.
U. minutissima f. albiflora (Komiya) Komiya & C.Shibata
U. nigricaulis Ridl.
U. nipponica Makino
U. nipponica f. albiflora Komiya
U. pygmaea R.Br.
U. siamensis Ostenf.
Vesiculina pygmaea (R.Br.) Raf.

See also 
 List of Utricularia species

References 

minutissima
Carnivorous plants of Asia
Carnivorous plants of Australia
Flora of China
Flora of Japan
Flora of Queensland
Flora of tropical Asia
Flora of the Northern Territory
Eudicots of Western Australia
Lamiales of Australia
Taxa named by Martin Vahl
Plants described in 1804